The ARIA Albums Chart ranks the best-performing albums and extended plays in Australia. Its data, published by the Australian Recording Industry Association, is based collectively on each album and EP's weekly physical and digital sales. In 2011, sixteen albums claimed the top spot, including Pink's Greatest Hits... So Far!!!, which started its peak position in late 2010. Seven acts achieved their first number-one album in Australia: The Strokes, Britney Spears, Drapht, Adele, Gotye, Florence and the Machine, and Nickelback.

Michael Bublé earned two number-one albums during the year for Crazy Love and Christmas. Adele's 21 was the longest-running number-one album, having topped the ARIA Albums Chart for twenty-three weeks in 2011 and an additional nine weeks in 2012.

Chart history

Number-one artists

See also
2011 in music
List of number-one singles of 2011 (Australia)

References

2011
Australia Albums
2011 in Australian music